UFC Fight Night: Blaydes vs. Ngannou 2 (also known as UFC Fight Night 141) was a mixed martial arts event produced by the Ultimate Fighting Championship that was held on November 24, 2018 at  Cadillac Arena in Beijing, China.

Background
The event marked the promotion's first visit to Beijing. The UFC previously visited Mainland China for UFC Fight Night: Bisping vs. Gastelum in November 2017.

A heavyweight rematch between former UFC Heavyweight Championship challenger Francis Ngannou and Curtis Blaydes served as the event headliner. The pairing met previously in April 2016 at UFC Fight Night: Rothwell vs. dos Santos, with Ngannou winning the fight via TKO stoppage at the conclusion of the second round.

Shana Dobson was scheduled to face Wu Yanan at the event. However, Dobson pulled out of the fight in mid-October citing an injury and was replaced by Lauren Mueller.

Elizeu Zaleski dos Santos was expected to face Li Jingliang at the event. However, Santos pulled out from the bout on October 27 due to a knee injury. He was replaced by David Zawada.

Frankie Saenz was expected to face Song Yadong at the event. However, on November 7, it was reported that he pulled out of the bout due to injury and was replaced by promotional newcomer Vince Morales.

At the weigh-ins, Rashad Coulter weighed in at 208 pounds, 2 pounds over the light heavyweight non-title fight limit of 206. Coulter was fined 20 percent of his purse, which went to his opponent Hu Yaozong.

Results

Bonus awards
The following fighters received $50,000 bonuses:
Fight of the Night: Alex Morono vs. Kenan Song
Performances of the Night: Francis Ngannou and Li Jingliang

See also 
 List of UFC events
 2018 in UFC
 List of current UFC fighters

References 

UFC Fight Night
2018 in mixed martial arts
2018 in Chinese sport
Mixed martial arts in China
Sport in China
Sports competitions in Beijing
Sports competitions in China
November 2018 sports events in China